The Battle of Jaguarí was a naval confrontation in the Paraguayan War between Brazilian and Paraguayan flotillas, which took place on March 23, 1866 at the mouth of the Jaguari River, Paraná River. At the time, aboard the steamer Cisnei, were admiral Joaquim Marques Lisboa and generals Osório, Mitre and Flores. The ship was escorted by the ironclad Tamandaré and the gunboats Beberibe and Henrique Martins, and was on a reconnaissance mission on the Paraná River to the mouth of Jaguari. However, at eleven o'clock in the morning, the Paraguayan steamer Gualeguai and a towed boat found the Brazilian flotilla in Jaguari and immediately started bombing them, without causing damage. Only Tamandaré ran aground on the island of Itapiru. Despite the confrontation, the region's recognition proved to be useful to the allies, as the future location for the landing of the Triple Alliance troops that would initiate the invasion of Paraguayan territory was defined.

References 

Jaguarí
Jaguarí
March 1866 events